The  was a cadet branch of the Fujiwara clan. It was founded by Fujiwara no Maro

Maro had three brothers: Muchimaro, Fusasaki, and Umakai. These four brothers are known for having established the "four houses" of the Fujiwara.

See also
 Hokke (Fujiwara)
 Nanke (Fujiwara)
 Shikike

Notes

References
 Brinkley, Frank and Dairoku Kikuchi. (1915). A History of the Japanese People from the Earliest Times to the End of the Meiji Era. New York: Encyclopædia Britannica. OCLC 413099
 Nussbaum, Louis-Frédéric and Käthe Roth. (2005). Japan Encyclopedia. Cambridge: Harvard University Press. ;  OCLC 58053128

Fujiwara clan
Japanese clans